Brendon Bernard O'Donnell (12 April 1917 – 23 August 1996) was an Australian rules footballer who played with St Kilda in the Victorian Football League (VFL).

Notes

External links 

1917 births
Australian rules footballers from Victoria (Australia)
St Kilda Football Club players
Prahran Football Club players
1996 deaths